ORP Jastrząb ("Hawk") was a former S-class  submarine, originally of the United States Navy, in Polish service between 1941 and 1942, when she was lost to friendly fire.

Ship history

In 1940 she was set aside as a training vessel, and then earmarked for transfer to the Royal Navy under Lend-Lease.

She was decommissioned from the U.S. Navy on 4 November 1941, and simultaneously transferred to the Royal Navy as HMS P551; shortly thereafter she was loaned to the exiled Polish government, and entered service with the Polish Navy under Lieutenant Commander Bolesław Romanowski, due to a lack of trained submarine crews in the Royal Navy at the time.

Jastrząb entered the history of the Polish Navy as its only submarine ever to cross the Atlantic Ocean from the West to the East, as she came from the US to Europe.

During the passage of convoy PQ-15 to Murmansk, Jastrząb on 2 May 1942 was mistakenly engaged by the destroyer  and the minesweeper . She was attacked with depth charges and made to surface, there she was strafed with the loss of five crew (including the British liaison officer) and six injured, including the commander. The ship was badly damaged and had to be scuttled, near .

The incident is a matter of some controversy. One source  states Jastrząb was escorting PQ 15, i.e. travelling with the convoy. Others however  state she was covering PQ 15’s passage by patrolling the Norwegian coast against a sortie by German capital ships, one of five submarines so assigned. These sources state Jastrząb was out of position; Pertek however states that it was the convoy which was out of position, and other sources confirm the convoy had altered course to avoid ice. The position of the incident, 200 miles from the Norwegian coast is inconsistent with a mission to patrol that coast, typically no more than 10 to 20 miles out.
 
Pertek also (after Romanowski's testimony) states Jastrząb was fired upon despite showing yellow recognition smoke candles; however other sources do not confirm this. Finally Pertek states the commanders of St Albans and Seagull were found guilty at a court martial over the incident; Kemp states that the court of enquiry (a normal procedure following the loss of a ship, though not of friendly fire cases) found no blame could be attributed to either commander. It is not possible to reconcile these accounts.

On 5 May 1942, the convoy reached Murmansk, where the Polish crew remained resting for two and a half months, then returned to Great Britain on board the Polish destroyer .

See also 
 , another Polish submarine lost during World War II.

Notes and Citations

Notes

Citations

References
 Kemp, Paul (1993) Convoy! Drama in Arctic Waters 
 Pertek, Jerzy (1976) Wielkie dni małej floty, Poznań 
 Schofield, Bernard (1964) The Russian Convoys BT Batsford ISBN (none)

External links 
  ORP Jastrazab at uboat.net 
 

Ships transferred from the United States Navy to the Royal Navy
United States S-class submarines of the Royal Navy
Ships transferred from the United States Navy to the Polish Navy
United States S-class submarines of the Polish Navy
Ships built in Quincy, Massachusetts
1922 ships
World War II submarines of Poland
World War II shipwrecks in the Arctic Ocean
Maritime incidents in May 1942
Friendly fire incidents of World War II
Submarines sunk by British warships
Submarines sunk by Norwegian warships

de:ORP Jastrząb (1941)
pl:ORP Jastrząb (okręt podwodny)